There have been various famous members of the Stransham family:

Anthony Blaxland Stransham (d. 1900), general, leader of the Royal Marines during the First Opium War
Edward Stransham (c. 1557–1586), English Roman Catholic priest and Catholic martyr 
Streynsham Master (1640–1724), pioneer in the British East India Company